Gary Wells may refer to:

 Gary L. Wells, psychologist
 Gary Wells (motorcyclist), motorcyclist